Senator Etheridge may refer to:

Emerson Etheridge (1819–1902), Tennessee State Senate
Samuel Etheridge (1788–1864), Michigan State Senate
Forest Etheredge (1929–2004), Illinois State Senate